StatXact is a statistical software package for analyzing data using exact statistics. It calculates exact p-values and confidence intervals for contingency tables and non-parametric procedures. It is marketed by Cytel Inc.

References

External links
 StatXact homepage at Cytel Inc.

Statistical software
Windows-only software